Kąty may refer to any of the following places:

Kąty, Gmina Brześć Kujawski, Kuyavian-Pomeranian Voivodeship (north-central Poland)
Kąty, Gmina Lubień Kujawski, Kuyavian-Pomeranian Voivodeship (north-central Poland)
Kąty, Biała Podlaska County, Lublin Voivodeship (eastern Poland)
Kąty, Biłgoraj County, Lublin Voivodeship (eastern Poland)
Kąty, Kolno County, Podlaskie Voivodeship (north-eastern Poland)
Kąty, Łomża County, Podlaskie Voivodeship (north-eastern Poland)
Kąty, Mońki County, Podlaskie Voivodeship (north-eastern Poland)
Kąty, Siemiatycze County, Podlaskie Voivodeship (north-eastern Poland)
Kąty, Kutno County, Łódź Voivodeship (central Poland)
Kąty, Łask County, Łódź Voivodeship (central Poland)
Kąty, Pajęczno County, Łódź Voivodeship (central Poland)
Kąty, Radomsko County, Łódź Voivodeship (central Poland)
Kąty, Wieluń County, Łódź Voivodeship (central Poland)
Kąty, Wieruszów County, Łódź Voivodeship (central Poland)
Kąty, Brzesko County, Lesser Poland Voivodeship (southern Poland)
Kąty, Opole Lubelskie County, Lublin Voivodeship (eastern Poland)
Kąty, Dąbrowa County, Lesser Poland Voivodeship (southern Poland)
Kąty, Gorlice County, Lesser Poland Voivodeship (southern Poland)
Kąty, Ryki County, Lublin Voivodeship (eastern Poland)
Kąty, Nowy Targ County, Lesser Poland Voivodeship (southern Poland)
Kąty, Proszowice County, Lesser Poland Voivodeship (southern Poland)
Kąty, Subcarpathian Voivodeship (south-eastern Poland)
Kąty, Staszów County, Świętokrzyskie Voivodeship (south-central Poland)
Kąty, Włoszczowa County, Świętokrzyskie Voivodeship (south-central Poland)
Kąty, Ciechanów County, Masovian Voivodeship (east-central Poland)
Kąty, Mińsk County, Masovian Voivodeship (east-central Poland)
Kąty, Otwock County, Masovian Voivodeship (east-central Poland)
Kąty, Gmina Sobienie-Jeziory, Masovian Voivodeship (east-central Poland)
Kąty, Piaseczno County, Masovian Voivodeship (east-central Poland)
Kąty, Sochaczew County, Masovian Voivodeship (east-central Poland)
Kąty, Węgrów County, Masovian Voivodeship (east-central Poland)
Kąty, Jarocin County, Greater Poland Voivodeship (west-central Poland)
Kąty, Leszno County, Greater Poland Voivodeship (west-central Poland)
Kąty, Rawicz County, Greater Poland Voivodeship (west-central Poland)
Kąty, Słupca County, Greater Poland Voivodeship (west-central Poland)
Kąty, Elbląg County, Warmian-Masurian Voivodeship (northern Poland)
Kąty, Kętrzyn County, Warmian-Masurian Voivodeship (northern Poland)
Kąty, West Pomeranian Voivodeship (north-western Poland)
Kąty Wrocławskie, Lower Silesian Voivodeship (south-western Poland)

See also
 Katy (disambiguation)